Mariama Touré (born 10 November 2003) is a Guinean swimmer. She competed in the women's 100 metre breaststroke at the 2020 Summer Olympics.

References 

Living people
2003 births
Guinean female swimmers
African Games competitors for Guinea
Swimmers at the 2019 African Games